Robert Pitts may refer to:
 R. C. Pitts American basketball player
 Robert B. Pitts, HUD regional administrator

See also
Robert Pitt (1680–1727), British politician
Robert Pitt (physician) (1653–1713), English physician